John Allan Hill FREng, FIStructE, FICE, FIAE, FIEI  is a British structural engineer born in 1938.

Early life and education 
Hill was born in Wembley, London but the family moved to Belfast where his father W A Hill was a railway civil engineer. He was educated at Belfast Royal Academy before reading Civil Engineering at Queen's University Belfast.

Career 
After graduating in 1960 Hill returned to London to work for A.J. & J.D. Harris (later Harris & Sutherland and Jacobs Engineering since 2004). He worked on the structural design of schools and offices and the Commonwealth Institute building in South Kensington using prestressed concrete. He married June in 1961 and the couple moved to Derry where Hill worked for the civil engineering contracting company Farrans Construction  on the building of the Coolkeeragh power station. He returned to consulting engineering in Belfast first working with Robert Gillen and then Dr I G Doran & Partners (Doran Consulting since 2005). Hill‘s projects included Craigavon Area Hospital and Antrim Area Hospital, Craigavon Shopping Centre  with a cable stayed roof, long span construction at Valley Leisure Centre, the De Lorean motor car factory at Dunmurry, office buildings including Castle Buildings at Stormont. He has designed highway bridges, cable stayed and suspension footbridges. Design work for Iraq included extensive foundations and a major pipe-sinking below the Tigris, both in Baghdad. He led the design of plant supporting steelwork for Sizewell B Nuclear Power Station, Suffolk, and Guangdong in China. 

From 1992 until his retirement in 2002 Hill was senior partner of Dr I G Doran & Partners. Hill was the Royal Academy of Engineering Visiting Professor at both Queen's University and the University of Ulster. He was a member of the Northern Ireland Building Regulations Advisory Committee. Hill was President of the Institution of Structural Engineers in 2000-01 and chairman of the Joint Board of Moderators - the accrediting body for degree courses for the construction industry 2005-07.

Awards and honours 
Honorary Degree Queen’s University Belfast

References 

Presidents of the Institution of Structural Engineers
British structural engineers
1938 births
Living people
Alumni of Queen's University Belfast
People educated at the Belfast Royal Academy